Quimper may refer to:

 Arrondissement of Quimper, an arrondissement in the department of Finistère, France
 Quimper, Finistère, a commune in that arrondissement
 Quimper faience, a style of faience pottery produced in a factory near Quimper, in France
 Manuel Quimper, a Peruvian-born Spanish explorer, cartographer, naval officer, and colonial official
 Quimper Peninsula, narrow peninsula in northwestern Washington state named after the explorer Manuel Quimper